Mia Abbas Uddin (1 January 1949 – 28 December 2017) Bangladesh Nationalist Party politician. He was elected a member of parliament from Bagerhat-4 in 1988.

Early life 
Mia Abbas Uddin was born on 1 January 1949 in Bagerhat District. His father Manik Mia and mother Raushan Ara. She married Setara Abbas. They have 1 son and 3 daughters.

Career 
Mia Abbas Uddin was elected to parliament from Bagerhat-4 as an independent candidate in 1988 Bangladeshi general election. In 1990, he joined the Bangladesh Nationalist Party (BNP). He was the president of Morelganj Upazila BNP. In 2014, he moved to Canada with his family.

Death 
Mia Abbas Uddin died on 28 December 2017 at a hospital in Ottawa, Canada, from a brain tumor and geriatric disease.

References 

1949 births
2017 deaths
People from Bagerhat District
Bangladeshi emigrants to Canada
Bangladesh Nationalist Party politicians
4th Jatiya Sangsad members